NTO may refer to:
 

 Nitrogen tetroxide, a hypergolic rocket propellant component
 National Training Organisation; for example e-skills UK
 National tourism organisation, members of the European Travel Commission
 , one of the original Swedish temperance movements that formed IOGT-NTO